Brent Wilson is an American documentary film director, writer and producer. He is best known for his work on the documentary films Streetlight Harmonies and Brian Wilson: Long Promised Road.

Career
Wilson directed his debut feature documentary, The Last Reunion: A Gathering of Heroes, which premiered at the Palm Beach International Film Festival and won best documentary in 2003. In 2020, he directed the documentary Streetlight Harmonies, which premiered at Doc NYC. In 2020, he directed the documentary Brian Wilson: Long Promised Road, about the Beach Boys' co-founder Brian Wilson, which premiered at the Tribeca Film Festival.

Selected filmography

Awards and nominations

References

External links
 

Living people
American documentary film directors
American documentary film producers
American television producers
Year of birth missing (living people)